Elektrisk Bureau or EB was a Norwegian manufacturer of telecommunication equipment. It was founded in 1882 and lasted until 1993 when it became part of Asea Brown Boveri (ABB). The company was located at Billingstad in Asker.

History
In 1882 Carl Söderberg founded EB. The background was that Söderberg, who had started a telephone union in Christiania, felt that Bell System had been charging too high prices. In 1885 the company was made limited and a year later Akers Mekaniske Verksted became the largest owner. EB became the largest domestic producer of telephone systems as well as export. But during the 1920s when the automatic centrals were introduced, EB lost its leading position. Instead focus was moved to the consumer market, and in 1928 L. M. Ericsson became the main owner of EB, granting a great deal of patents that EB could utilize. EB also had close connections with Televerket, whom EB was the largest producer of telecommunication equipment for. This was especially true in the late 1960s to abolish waiting lists for telephone lines. The Swedish ASEA eventually bought 67% of EB, and in 1988 the company became part of the new Asea Brown Boveri (ABB) group, through the brand EB was used until 1993, when ABB bought the rest of EB.

Companies established in 1882
Manufacturing companies based in Oslo
ABB